Bahadur Khan Gilani was an officer of the Gujarat Sultanate. During 1491–1494, the islands of Bombay were wrested from Gilani's control by the Bahamani general Mahmud Gavan.

During the greater portion of the 15th century, from the reign of Ahmad Shah I (1411-41) to that of Bahadur Shah (1527-36) Bombay remained in the hands of the Gujarat monarchy. Gilani extended his depredations on the western coast of India further to the north so that ships from the port-towns of Gujarat were at his mercy and some of the Sultan's own vessels were captured. One of Bahadur's officers, an Abyssinian named Yaqut, is said by Firishta to have attacked Mahim, near Bombay, with a fleet of twelve ships, and to have sacked and burnt the place.

References

External links
 Greater Bombay District Gazetteer (Muhammedan Period)

History of Mumbai
Gujarat Sultanate
Indian military personnel
15th-century Indian politicians
Bahmani Sultanate
Military personnel from Mumbai
People from Gilan Province